
De Saffraan is a restaurant located in Amersfoort in the Netherlands. It is a fine dining restaurant that was awarded one Michelin star in the period 2010–2014.

GaultMillau awarded the restaurant 15 out of 20 points.

Owner and head chef of De Saffraan is Kars van Wechem.

The restaurant is located in a 100-year-old clipper named "Hoop op Welvaart", which is moored at a quay of Kleine Koppel in Amersfoort. The clipper is completely renovated and adjusted to its role as restaurant.

Awards
 Michelin star 2009–2014
 Best restaurant at culinair festival Proef Amersfoort, 2009

See also
List of Michelin starred restaurants in the Netherlands

References 

Restaurants in the Netherlands
Michelin Guide starred restaurants in the Netherlands
Restaurants in Amersfoort